Manolín is a nickname and refer to:

Manolín "El Médico de la salsa", Cuban salsa singer
Manolín Bueno (born 1940), Spanish footballer
Manolín (footballer, born 1988), Spanish footballer
Manolín (footballer, born 1928), Spanish footballer
Manolín, a character in The Old Man and the Sea